The Leicester Warriors are an English semi-professional basketball club from Leicester, Leicestershire. Founded in 2003, the Warriors play their home games at Braunstone Leisure Centre and compete in NBL Division 1, the second tier of the British basketball system.  The club runs extensive community programmes and grass root teams in the Leicester area.

History
The club were founded in 2003 by Leicester-born ex-England and Georgia Tech basketball player Karl Brown, with an emphasis on running community based programmes addressing social issues as well as encouraging participation in basketball.  

The club won promotion to EBL Division Two after their first season, and spent the following years consolidating their position in the division. The Warriors claimed their first major trophy on 4 March 2007, when they won the Patrons Cup, beating the Bristol Flyers 61-55 in the final at the Newcastle Arena, and seeing former Leicester Riders player Drew Barrett named MVP.  The 2008-09 season also saw another leap forward for the Warriors, claiming third place in the league and winning promotion to Division One for the following season, where the team has competed ever since.

In September 2015, the club confirmed that 2001-born Kareem Queeley had signed a 2-year contract with basketball powerhouse Real Madrid.

Players

Current squad

Notable former players

  Kareem Queeley

Season-by-season records

References

External links
Official Leicester Warriors website
Official Leicester Warriors instagram account
Official Leicester Warriors facebook page
Official Leicester Warriors twitter page

Basketball teams in England